Calzaghe is a surname. Notable people with the surname include:

Enzo Calzaghe (1949–2018), Italian-born Welsh boxing trainer
Joe Calzaghe (born 1972), Welsh boxer, son of Enzo

Italian-language surnames